Markus Weicker (born December 17, 1987, in Offenbach am Main) is a German director and musician.

Life 
Weicker grew up in Offenbach am Main and studied architecture in Darmstadt. Under the name Gibmafuffi he produced for artists like Döll, Mädness, Morlockk Dilemma, Kool Savas, and Karate Andi; and released an EP and two instrumental albums: Trinkhallenromantik in 2014, Spielschulden in 2016, and Still Storch in 2019. His beats are influenced by the so-called Eastcoast sound of the 90s and are mostly produced analogue. He mainly uses samples.

In 2010, Weicker started the directing duo The Factory with his twin brother Michael. In the following years, the brothers released music videos for various German artists such as RIN, Kollegah, and Genetikk. At the same time, they began to realize projects in the advertising film industry. Since 2017 they have been under contract with the Berlin-based advertising production company BWGTBLD.

In 2016, Weicker started the label Division in Düsseldorf with his brother Michael and business partner Elvir Omerbegovic and signed the artist RIN. Two albums and a mixtape were released, which won several gold and platinum awards. They also received several Echo nominations as well as the 1-Live Krone for the best album in 2017. In the course of the releases there were three tours in German-speaking countries with a total of more than 175,000 viewers. In 2019, the label entered into a partnership with Sony Music in the form of a distribution deal.

Discography

Albums 
 2014: Trinkhallenromantik (EP)
 2016: Spielschulden 
 2019: Still Storch

As producer 
 2014: Döll – Weit entfernt (EP)
 2014: Mädness – Maggo (EP)
 2016: Karate Andi – Turbo
 2017: Mädness & Döll – Ich und mein Bruder
 2019: Döll – Nie oder Jetzt
 2019: Morlockk Dilemma – Eros in Dystopolis

Awards

As rights holder 

 2017: Gold Record in Germany for RIN – Blackout 
 2017: Gold Record in Germany for RIN – Bros 
 2017: Platinum Record in Germany for RIN – Bros 
 2017: Gold Record in Austria for RIN – Bros 
 2017: Gold Record in Switzerland for RIN – Bros 
 2017: Gold Record in Germany for RIN – Monica Bellucci 
 2017: Platinum Record in Germany for RIN – Monica Bellucci 
 2017: Gold Record in Austria for RIN – Monica Bellucci 
 2017: Gold Record in Switzerland for RIN – Monica Bellucci 
 2018: Gold Record in Germany for RIN – Avirex     
 2018: Gold Record in Germany for RIN – Dior 2001 
 2018: Platinum Record in Germany for RIN – Dior 2001   
 2018: Gold Record in Austria for RIN – Dior 2001 
 2018: Platinum Record in Austria for RIN – Dior 2001 
 2019: Gold Record in Germany for RIN – Alien 
 2019: Gold Record in Germany for RIN – Fabergé 
 2019: Gold Record in Germany for RIN – Keine Liebe    
 2019: Gold Record in Germany for RIN – Vintage

Artist awards with share as rights holder 
 2017: 1LIVE Krone RIN – Eros Best Album 
 2018: Echo Nomination RIN – Eros Best Production 
 2018: Echo Nomination RIN Newcomer of the Year 
 2019: 1LIVE Krone Nomination RIN Best Hip-Hop Act

As director 
 2012: Voice Independent Music Award Asia – Best Music Video 
 2012: Nomination MTV Music Asia Awards – Best Music Video 
 2013: Gold Record in Germany for Genetikk – DNA 
 2013: Gold Record in Germany for Kollegah, Farid Bang – JBG2 
 2013: Gold Record in Germany for Kollegah, Farid Bang – JBG2 
 2014: CCA Award Silber 
 2014: Cannes Lions International Festival of Creativity Shortlist 
 2014: Gold Record in Germany for Kollegah – King 
 2014: Triple Gold Record in Germany for Kollegah – King 
 2014: Platinum Record in Germany for Kollegah – King 
 2014: Platinum Record in Austria for Kollegah – King 
 2014: Gold Record in Germany for Kollegah – Alpha 
 2015: Gold Record in Germany for Genetikk – Achter Tag 
 2015: Gold Record in Germany for Kollegah – ZHT4 
 2015: Platinum Record in Germany for Kollegah – ZHT4 
 2015: Gold Record in Austria for Kollegah – ZHT4

References 

Film directors from Hesse
German record producers
People from Offenbach am Main
1987 births
Living people